Coloradia luski, or Lusk's pine moth, is a species of insect in the family Saturniidae. It was first described by William Barnes and Foster Hendrickson Benjamin in 1926 and it is found in North America.

The MONA or Hodges number for Coloradia luski is 7726.

References

Further reading

 
 
 

Hemileucinae
Articles created by Qbugbot
Moths described in 1926